The Boston University Chobanian & Avedisian School of Medicine, formerly the Boston University School of Medicine, is one of the graduate schools of Boston University. Founded in 1848, the medical school  was the first institution in the world to formally educate female physicians. Originally known as the New England Female Medical College, it was subsequently renamed Boston University School of Medicine in 1873, then Chobanian & Avedisian School of Medicine in 2022. In 1864, it became the first medical school in the United States to award an M.D. degree to an African-American woman.

Chobanian & Avedisian School of Medicine is the only medical school located in the South End neighborhood of Boston, Massachusetts. Boston Medical Center, its primary teaching hospital, operates the largest 24-hour Level I trauma center in New England, and the largest network of regional community health centers.

Chobanian & Avedisian School of Medicine is the home of the Framingham Heart Study, from which all knowledge of cardiovascular disease risk factors were originally discovered. Notable alumni of the medical school include Marcia Angell, former editor-in-chief of the New England Journal of Medicine and the only woman to hold the position in the journal's almost 200-year history, as well as Louis Wade Sullivan, former Secretary of the US Department of Health and Human Services and founder of Morehouse School of Medicine. Chobanian & Avedisian School of Medicine is tied for 32nd on the 2023 list of Best Medical Schools in the Research category, and tied for 36th in the Primary Care category, by the U.S. News & World Report.

History
The New England Female Medical College was the first institution to medically train women, founded in 1848.  The institution was reformed and renamed in 1873 when Boston University merged with the New England Female Medical College and began to admit men as well as women. Following a $100 million donation in 2022 by philanthropist and clarinetist Edward Avedisian, the school name was formally changed once again to "Boston University Aram V. Chobanian & Edward Avedisian School of Medicine", honoring Avedisian and his friend, former dean of the medical school Aram V. Chobanian.

Recent class profile 
In the autumn of 2019, Boston University School of Medicine's first-year medical students were 48% female, and 14% were of an ethnicity that is under-represented in medicine.  Out of matriculated students, 124 are in the traditional 4-year Doctor of Medicine (MD) program. Average GPA was 3.69. Six students were enrolled in the MD-PhD program, and the rest were in some other type of non-traditional MD track. The school also offers joint degrees with other Boston University graduate schools, allowing the medical students to earn an MD degree with a Master of Business Administration (MBA), Master of Public Health (MPH), or PhD.

Students matriculating came from 29 states and 19 countries. Average MCAT was 517. Students' ages ranged from 18 to 35.

People

Notable faculty

There are 1,159 faculty members at BU's School of Medicine: 946 full-time and 213 part-time. Notable faculty include:
Andrew E. Budson (2005-present), Professor of Neurology
Alfred I. Tauber (1982–present), recipient of the 2008 Science Medal awarded by the University of Bologna
Karen H. Antman (2005–present), professor of medicine, Provost and Dean
Osamu Shimomura (1982–present), 2008 recipient of the Nobel Prize in Chemistry

Notable alumni

Marcia Angell (MD'67), Former editor of the New England Journal of Medicine 
 Jennifer Berman, sexual health expert, urologist, and female sexual medicine specialist
 Ida Joe Brooks (MD 1891), among Arkansas's earliest women physicians and the first female faculty member at the University of Arkansas Medical School
Rebecca Lee Crumpler (MD1864), the first African-American to receive an M.D. in the United States and a graduate of the New England Female College (1848–1873), which merged with Boston University in 1873
Franklin Ware Mann (MD1880) – pioneering ballistics researcher and inventor of the Mann rest adopted by the National Institute of Standards and Technology and Aberdeen Proving Ground
Fe Del Mundo (MS'40), National Scientist of the Philippines 
Ralph David Feigin (MD'62), Current Physician-in-Chief of the Texas Children's Hospital
 I Michael Leitman (MD'85) American surgeon and Dean for Graduate Medical Education, Icahn School of Medicine at Mount Sinai
Edward Ross Ritvo (MD'55), autism researcher, Neuropsychiatric Institute, David Geffen School of Medicine at UCLA
Louis Wade Sullivan (MD'58), President of the Morehouse School of Medicine and former U.S. Secretary of Health and Human Services
Louis Weinstein (MD'43), microbiologist and infectious disease physician
Lawrence Yannuzzi (MD'64), angiography pioneer

Graduate medical sciences 
The school offers MA, MS, and PhD degrees through Graduate Medical Sciences.  The MA degree is in Mental Health Counseling and Behavioral Medicine.  An MS degree is available in Anatomy and Neurobiology - Vesalius Program, Bioimaging, Biomedical Forensics, Biomedical Research Technologies, Clinical Research, Forensic Anthropology, Genetic Counseling. Health Professions Education, Healthcare Emergency Management, Medical Anthropology & Cross Cultural Practice, Medical Sciences, Nutrition and Metabolism, Oral Health Sciences, Pathology Laboratory Sciences, Physician Assistant, and Physiology and Biophysics.

PhD and MD-PhD degrees are also granted in the following areas:

Clinical affiliates 

 Boston Medical Center — Boston, MA
 Boston Veterans Administration Medical Center - Various
 Central Maine Medical Center — Lewiston, ME
 Edith Nourse Rogers Memorial Veterans Hospital — Bedford, MA
 Norwood Hospital — Norwood, MA
 St. Elizabeth's Medical Center - Boston, MA

In popular culture
Boston University School of Medicine and the Boston Medical Center serve as the setting for Robin Cook's bestselling novel Coma as well as the film of the same name directed by Michael Crichton.

See also
 Boston Medical Center
 Goldman School of Dental Medicine
 Boston University School of Public Health
 Boston University Medical Campus

References

External links 
 Chobanian & Avedisian School of Medicine
 Graduate Medical Sciences
 Samuel Gregory. Letter to Ladies, in Favor of Female Physicians for their Own Sex (Boston: Published by The New England Female Medical College, 1856).

School of Medicine
School of Medicine
Universities and colleges in Boston
Medical schools in Massachusetts
Educational institutions established in 1848

1848 establishments in Massachusetts